Joey’s Song raises money for epilepsy research and programs in honor of four-year-old Joey Gomoll, who passed one week shy of his fifth birthday from a rare form of the disease called Dravet Syndrome.  Grammy winners, Top 40 hitmakers, and special guests donate their time to perform at benefit concerts to raise awareness about epilepsy, which affects more people than multiple sclerosis, cerebral palsy, muscular dystrophy and Parkinson’s disease COMBINED.  

Joey’s Song events have grown substantially since the organization started in 2010, showcasing artists such as Butch Vig and Duke Erikson of Garbage, musicians from Soul Asylum and Fountains of Wayne, Belly, and many more.  More than 100 artists have contributed original and rare musical content to the Joey’s Song series of compilation CDs.  

Joey's Song is the name of a series of music compilation CDs featuring nationally and internationally known artists who are donating their music to help raise awareness and monies to fight epilepsy.  The Joey's Song CD series was launched by The Joseph Gomoll Foundation.  The Joseph Gomoll Foundation was started in April 2010 following the death of 4-year-old Joey Gomoll.  Over 100 artists have agreed to support and contribute original and rare musical content to the Joey's Song series of CDs.

About Joey 
Joey's Song was set up as a tribute to honor Joseph Martin Gomoll who died unexpectedly on March 30, 2010 just shy of his 5th birthday. Joey was afflicted with Dravet’s Syndrome, a rare form of epilepsy, his entire life.  Joey had a love for music and it was a big part of his life.  The CD series is a perfect way to remember him as he could often be seen laughing, smiling, singing or dancing to music.

Aims and aspirations of the Joey's Song CD series 
Since 2011, The Joseph Gomoll Foundation, headquartered in Wisconsin, has been releasing a series of CDs called Joey’s Song.  All money raised is directly benefiting children with special needs and those suffering from seizures. The CDs feature donated rare and unreleased songs from major recording acts from around the world.  There is a companion series of CDs of children’s music as well, most recorded specifically for Joey’s Song.

The Foundation is planning to release multiple CDs annually. A successful series of CDs will result in thousands of dollars annually being targeted for epilepsy research and awareness! The Foundation’s goal is to truly make a difference in the lives of children with special needs and all those suffering from seizures.

Joey's Song: Volume 1 track listing 
Volume 1 was released January 25, 2011.  It features rare and unreleased songs from major recording acts from around the world. The CD contains multiple Grammy/Oscar nominated artists and others who are legends in their field.

Joey's Song Volume 1 track listing 
 "Hang On Mike" (live) – Mike Viola *
 "If Your Tears Don’t Make a Sound" (demo) – Justin Currie of Del Amitri *
 "In Love With You" – Tim Easton *
 "The Difference" - Thea Gilmore *
 "The Sweetest Sound of All" - Ed Harcourt *
 "People Got A lot of Nerve" – Neko Case
 "Mmmm, Mmmm, Mmmm" (live) - Crash Test Dummies
 "Streets Of Laredo" – Slaid Cleaves
 "This Street, This Man, This Life" (acoustic) - Cowboy Junkies*
 "Wash & Fold" (live) - DADDY - featuring Will Kimbrough and Tommy Womack*
 "All Thumbs" (demo) – Tracy Bonham *
 "I Believe In You" – Robbie Fulks *
 "14th Street and Mars" (alternate version) - Michelle Malone *
 "Seven Angels" - HEM *
 "Carry Your Cross" (demo)  -- Michael McDermott *
 "Still I Dream"- AA Bondy *
 = previously unreleased.

Joey's Song for Kids: Volume 1 - Track listing 
Joey's Song for Kids: Volume 1 is composed of children’s songs, most recorded specifically for Joey’s Song.  The CD contains children’s classics, such as "Wheels on the Bus" (Lowen & Navarro) as well as songs like "Oh, Johnny LeBeck" (Eileen Rose) which has special meaning to the artists.
 "Monkeys" - Steve Wynn *
 "Oh Johnny LeBeck"  - Eileen Rose and The Legendary Rich Gilbert *
 "Baby Clap"  - Greg Percy *
 "The Wheels on the Bus" (live) - Lowen & Navarro *
 "Little Blue Horses"  - The Sleepytones
 "Say, Say, Oh Playmate"  - April Smith and The Great Picture Show *
 "Hippopotamus"  - Jon Dee Graham
 "Pickle Me Juice" - Ralph Covert *
 "Mr. Teetot" -  Ellis Paul *
 "Working On The Railroad" - The Band Of Blacky Ranchette (aka Howe Gelb) *
 "Upside Down Town"  - Greg Trooper *
 "Dan Blocker"  - Gurf Morlix
 "And It's Beautiful"  - Crash Test Dummies
 "You Are My Sunshine" -  Matthew Ryan *
 "Sam's Lullaby"  - Phil Lee *
 = previously unreleased.

Joey's Song: Volume 2 track listing 
Joey’s Song Volume 2 was released September 23, 2012 and features rare and unreleased music from a broad array of music stars and legends.  Nearly all of the music on Joey’s Song Volume 2 CDs are not available anywhere else.  Joey’s Song CDs contain music from artists who have been recognized with Grammy nominations, Top 10 songs, hall of fame inductions, Juno awards and more.

Joey's Song Volume 2 track listing 
 "Lying (Long-Play Version)"  - Sam Phillips
 "No Surprise"  - Willie Wisely Trio *
 "No Water, No Wood"  - Mark Olson
 "Seven Year Ache (Live from Zone C)"  - Rosanne Cash *
 "New Orleans"  - Peter Bradley Adams *
 "Loud Boy"  - The Small Ponds *
 "In The Canyon (live)"  - Gary Louris *
 "Once (live)"  - Mark Erelli *
 "Love"  - Star & Micey *
 "Jesse Likes Birds"  - Carrie Elkin
 "Far Too Far"  - Trespassers William
 "Carefree"  - Holly Beth Vincent *
 "Love Knows No Borders"  - Giant Sand
 "Under The Waves (live studio recording)"  - Pete Drige *
 "Hastings-On-Hudson (Summer 2000)"  - Mark Kozelek *
 = previously unreleased.

Joey's Song for Kids: Volume 2 - Track listing 
 "The Spinning Song"  - The Knack
 "There's A Hole In The bottom Of The Sea"  - The Weirdo Deluxe *
 "Wiggly Wah"  - Martha Davis *
 "La La Love"  - Robbie Schaefer
 "Return To Pooh Corner"  - Bryan Cole *
 "Sparky The Heroic Dog"  - Freedy Johnston *
 "Not Afraid of Nothin'"  - Joe Bainbridge *
 "Snowball"  - The Handsome Family
 "Take Me Out To The Ballgame"  - The Baseball Project *
 "The Cat Went In The Hole"  - The Sursiks
 "B-I-N-G-O"  - Robbins & Glazer *
 "Little Red Wagon"  - Wynn Taylor *
 "Pick Yourself Up"  - The Yell Leaders *
 "Candy Garden"  - The Bazillions *
 "Bye Bye Day"  - Eddie Kilgallon *
 "Child Asleep"  - Sam Llanas *
 = previously unreleased.

References

Further reading 
 Tanzilo, Bobby Omnivore distribution boosts new set of Joey's Song discs OnMilwaukee.com Article, Published July 9, 2012
 Omnivore Recordings to Release Joey's Song Volume 2, A Compilation Benefit CD Series Fighting Epilepsy with Music, Omnivore Recordings press release, Los Angeles, CA – July 10, 2012
 
 
 
 ]

External links 
 Official Joeyssong website 
 Official Joey's Song Facebook page 
 Official Joeyssong Twitter account 
 Official Joeyssong YouTube channel
 Official Joey's Song Myspace Page 

2010 albums